Amorphoscelis tigrina is a species of praying mantis found in West Africa (Benin, Burkina Faso, Guinea, Cameroon, Nigeria, and Senegal).

References

Amorphoscelis
Mantodea of Africa
Insects described in 1913